Celtic Woman is the debut album released by the group Celtic Woman.

Background 
The group first featured on a musical special of the same name on American television broadcaster PBS, filmed live at the Helix Theatre in Dublin, Ireland in September 2004. With the help of the special, which was later made available on DVD, the group reached number one on the Billboard World Music charts within weeks of their debut, and remained there for a record eighty-six weeks. This success led the group's composer and musical director, David Downes, to adopt the title of "Celtic Woman" as their permanent name. Although originally intended as a one-time-only event, the group's music was so warmly received by the public that they immediately followed up with their first concert tour in the United States and Japan.

The album and special feature vocalists Chloë Agnew, Órla Fallon, Lisa Kelly, Méav Ní Mhaolchatha, and fiddler Máiréad Nesbitt, all of whom had never previously performed together prior to the group's formation.

Track listing

Personnel
Note: All information from liner notes.

Celtic Woman
 Chloë Agnew - vocals
 Órla Fallon - vocals, harp
 Lisa Kelly - vocals
 Máiréad Nesbitt - fiddle
 Méav Ní Mhaolchatha - vocals

Musicians
 David Downes - keyboards, piano, celesta, harpsichord, low whistle, whistle
 Eoghan O'Neill - bass guitar
 Martin Johnson - solo cello
 Ray Fean - percussion
 Robbie Casserly - percussion
 Des Moore - guitar
 Andreja Malir - harp
 John O'Brien - uilleann pipes, low whistle
 David Agnew - oboe

The Irish Film Orchestra
 John Page - conductor
 David Downes - arrangements, orchestrations

Aontas Choral Ensemble
 Rosemary Collier - director

Charts

Weekly charts

Year-end charts

Certifications

References

2005 debut albums
Celtic Woman albums
Manhattan Records albums
European Border Breakers Award-winning albums